Loveland is a town in Tillman County, Oklahoma, United States. The population was 13 at the 2010 census.  Loveland once had a post office that has since closed.  The post office was popular around Valentine's Day, when people often drove many miles to have their valentines postmarked "Loveland".

Geography
Loveland is located at  (34.305242, -98.771435).

Demographics

As of the census of 2000, there were 14 people, 6 households, and 6 families residing in the town. There were 8 housing units at an average density of 35.5 per square mile (13.4/km2). The racial makeup of the town was 92.86% White and 7.14% African American.

There were 6 households, out of which 33.3% had children under the age of 18 living with them, 100.0% were married couples living together, and 0.0% were non-families. No households were made up of individuals, and none had someone living alone who was 65 years of age or older. The average household size was 2.33 and the average family size was 2.33.

In the town, the population was spread out, with 14.3% under the age of 18, 14.3% from 18 to 24, 21.4% from 25 to 44, 35.7% from 45 to 64, and 14.3% who were 65 years of age or older. The median age was 43 years. For every 100 females, there were 133.3 males. For every 100 females age 18 and over, there were 100.0 males.

The median income for a household in the town was $25,000, and the median income for a family was $25,000. Males had a median income of $17,500 versus $0 for females. The per capita income for the town was $7,777. None of the population and none of the families were below the poverty line.

References

Towns in Tillman County, Oklahoma
Towns in Oklahoma